Blue Hotel may refer to:

 "Blue Hotel", a track on the 1982 Lene Lovich album No Man's Land
 "Blue Hotel", a single by Chris Isaak from his eponymous second album
 Blue Hotel (album), by the rock band Fox
 The Blue Hotel, an 1899 short story by Stephen Crane